Doros can refer to

Doros, Cyprus, a village in Limassol District
Doros, the medieval name for Mangup, Crimea
Doros (fly), a genus of insects in the family Syrphidae
Dorus (mythology), several characters named Dorus or Doros in Greek mythology
DorOS, mobile operating system, e.g. Doro 7081-phone